Rolls-Royce Motors was a British luxury car manufacturer, created in 1973 during the de-merger of the Rolls-Royce automotive business from the nationalised Rolls-Royce Limited. It produced luxury cars under the Rolls-Royce and Bentley brands. Vickers acquired the company in 1980 and sold it to Volkswagen in 1998.  Bentley Motors is the company's direct successor; however, BMW acquired the rights to the Rolls-Royce trademark for use on automobiles and launched a new Rolls-Royce company shortly afterwards.

History
The original Rolls-Royce Limited had been nationalised in 1971 due to the financial collapse of the company, caused in part by the development of the RB211 jet engine.  In 1973, the British government sold the Rolls-Royce car business to allow nationalised parent Rolls-Royce (1971) Limited to concentrate on jet engine manufacture.

In 1980, Rolls-Royce Motors was acquired by Vickers.

Sale to Volkswagen
In 1998, Vickers plc decided to sell Rolls-Royce Motors.  The leading contender seemed to be BMW, who already supplied internal combustion engines and other components for Rolls-Royce and Bentley cars.  Their final offer of £340m was outbid by Volkswagen Group, who offered £430m.

As part of the deal, Volkswagen Group acquired the historic Crewe factory, plus the rights to the "Spirit of Ecstasy" mascot and the shape of the radiator grille. However, the Rolls-Royce brand name and logo were controlled by aero-engine maker Rolls-Royce plc, and not Rolls-Royce Motors.  The aero-engine maker decided to license the Rolls-Royce name and logo to BMW and not to Volkswagen, largely because the aero-engine maker had recently shared joint business ventures with BMW.  BMW paid £40m to license the Rolls-Royce name and "RR" logo, a deal that many commentators thought was a bargain for possibly the most valuable property in the deal. Volkswagen Group had the rights to the mascot and grille, but lacked rights to the Rolls-Royce name in order to build the cars; likewise, BMW had the name, but lacked rights to the grille and mascot.

The situation was tilted in BMW's favour, as they could withdraw their engine supply with just 12 months notice, which was insufficient time for VW to re-engineer the Rolls-Royce cars to use VW's own engines. Volkswagen claimed that it only really wanted Bentley anyway, as it was the higher volume brand, with Bentley models out-selling the equivalent Rolls-Royce by around two to one.

Loss of Rolls-Royce marque
After negotiations, BMW and Volkswagen Group arrived at a solution.  From 1998 to 2002, BMW would continue to supply engines for the cars and would allow Volkswagen use of the Rolls-Royce name and logo.  On 1 January 2003, only BMW would be able to name cars "Rolls-Royce", and Volkswagen Group's former Rolls-Royce/Bentley division would build only cars called "Bentley".  The last Rolls-Royce from the Crewe factory, the Corniche, ceased production in 2002, at which time the Crewe factory became Bentley Motors Limited, and Rolls-Royce production was relocated to a new entity in Goodwood, England known as Rolls-Royce Motor Cars.

Despite losing control of the Rolls-Royce marque to BMW, the former Rolls-Royce/Bentley subsidiary retains historical Rolls-Royce car assets such as the Crewe factory and L Series V8 engine.

Leadership
1971–1980 Sir David Plastow
1980–1986 George Fenn
1986–1994 Peter Ward
1994–1998 Chris Woodwark
1998–1998 Graham Morris

Cars
1965–1980 Silver Shadow—the first Rolls-Royce with a monocoque chassis; started with a 6.23 L V8 engine, later expanded to 6.75 L; shared its design with the Bentley T-series
1968–1991 Phantom VI
1971–1996 Corniche I-IV
1975–1986 Camargue styled by Paolo Martin with a Pininfarina body
1980–1998 Silver Spirit/Silver Spur—design shared with the Bentley Mulsanne

Bentley models were produced mostly in parallel with the above cars.  The Bentley Continental coupés (produced in various forms from the mid-1950s to the mid-1960s) did not have Rolls-Royce equivalents.  Very expensive Rolls-Royce Phantom limousines were also produced.

Volkswagen Group era
1998–2002 Silver Seraph—This shared its design with the Bentley Arnage, which sold in much greater numbers.
2000–02 Corniche V—This two-door convertible shared its design with the Bentley Azure and was the most expensive Rolls-Royce until the introduction of the 2003 Phantom.

Rolls-Royce cars timeline

See also
Bentley
Rolls-Royce Limited
Luxury vehicle
 List of car manufacturers of the United Kingdom

Further reading
Richard Feast, Kidnap of the Flying Lady: How Germany Captured Both Rolls-Royce and Bentley, Motorbooks,

External links

Video (RT 05:02) Showcasing 1988 Silver Spur.

Car manufacturers of the United Kingdom
Rolls-Royce
Volkswagen Group
Luxury motor vehicle manufacturers
British companies established in 1973
Vehicle manufacturing companies established in 1973

cs:Rolls-Royce
ja:ロールスロイス